The American Comparative Literature Association (ACLA) is the principal learned society in the United States for scholars whose work connects several different literary traditions and cultures or that examines the premises of cross-cultural literary study. Founded in 1960, it has over 1,000 members, and is affiliated with other organizations like the American Council of Learned Societies, the Modern Language Association and the National Humanities Alliance.

Activities
Between other activities, the association offers four awards: the A. Owen Aldridge award, the Horst Frenz award, the Charles Bernheimer award and the Harry Levin and René Wellek award, the most important award for comparative literature in the United States.

External links
 American Comparative Literature Association official site

Literary societies
Learned societies of the United States
Comparative literature